

The Darmstadt D-29 was a German experimental monoplane designed and built by Akaflieg Darmstadt (of the Darmstadt University of Technology). The D-29 was a cantilever low-wing monoplane designed and built during 1936 with a conventional landing gear with a tailskid. It was powered by a Siemens-Halske Sh 14a radial piston engine and had enclosed  tandem cockpits, as well as a number of other features, including hydraulically actuated trailing-edge flaps, a braced T-tail and leading-edge slots.

Specifications

References

Notes

Bibliography

1930s German experimental aircraft
Akaflieg Darmstadt aircraft
Low-wing aircraft
Single-engined tractor aircraft
Aircraft first flown in 1936
T-tail aircraft